Eclipta nais is a species of beetle in the family Cerambycidae. It was described in 1911 by Pierre-Émile Gounelle .

References

Eclipta (beetle)
Beetles described in 1911